The Dunnigan Hills are a low mountain range in northern Yolo County, California.

The Dunnigan Hills AVA is in the northwestern area.

References 

Hills of California
Mountain ranges of Yolo County, California
Geography of the Sacramento Valley
Mountain ranges of Northern California